Pedro José Dorronsoro González (born 19 May 1977) is a Spanish retired footballer who played as a goalkeeper.

Club career
Born in Torrelavega, Cantabria, Dorronsoro finished his youth career with local SD Reocín, and made his senior debut with the club in the Tercera División. In summer 1997 he first arrived in the Segunda División B, signing with Gimnástica de Torrelavega.

In 2000, Dorronsoro joined Real Oviedo, being initially assigned to the reserves in the fourth level. On 25 May 2002 he appeared in his first match as a professional, starting in a 1–2 away loss against Xerez CD in the Segunda División.

Dorronsoro left the Asturians in 2003 and resumed his career in the third tier, representing Barakaldo CF, Jerez CF, Logroñés CF, UD Melilla and CD Tropezón. He retired with the latter side in June 2014 at the age of 37, being immediately appointed their assistant manager and goalkeeper coach. He left the position in June 2018, joining Racing de Santander in the latter capacity shortly after.

References

External links

1977 births
Living people
People from Torrelavega
Spanish footballers
Footballers from Cantabria
Association football goalkeepers
Segunda División players
Segunda División B players
Tercera División players
Gimnástica de Torrelavega footballers
Real Oviedo Vetusta players
Real Oviedo players
Barakaldo CF footballers
Logroñés CF footballers
UD Melilla footballers